Zakupne is an urban-type settlement in Kamianets-Podilskyi Raion (district) of Khmelnytskyi Oblast (province) in western Ukraine. It hosts the administration of Zakupne settlement hromada, one of the hromadas of Ukraine. The settlement's population was 1,452 as of the 2001 Ukrainian Census and 

Zakupne was first founded in the beginning of the 18th century, and it received the status of an urban-type settlement in 1972.

Until 18 July 2020, Zakupne belonged to Chemerivtsi Raion. The raion was abolished in July 2020 as part of the administrative reform of Ukraine, which reduced the number of raions of Khmelnytskyi Oblast to three. The area of Chemerivtsi Raion was merged into Kamianets-Podilskyi Raion.

See also
 Chemerivtsi, the other urban-type settlement in the Chemerivtsi Raion of Khmelnytskyi Oblast

References

Urban-type settlements in Kamianets-Podilskyi Raion
Podolia Governorate
Populated places established in the 18th century